Kristiyan Koev (Maestro Kristiyan Koev; Bulgarian: Кристиян Коев; 1 July 1970) is a Bulgarian flutist. Maestro Koev is also known as "Kristiyan Koev – The Golden Flute".

He was born in Sofia in a family of flutists. Both his parents are world-famous flutists-Nikolay Koev and Rositza Ivanova. His father is flutist and member of the Eolina quartet-the only one of its kind .His mother is the only flutist in the world who made a record of Leo Brouwer concert..
Kristiyan Koev spent his childhood in Havana, Cuba. His stepfather was Manuel Duchesne Cuzán  – professor at Alejandro García Caturla Conservatoire, General Director of the National Symphonic Orchestra of Cuba, Chief of the Musical Department of Symphonic Music from the Management Music at the Ministry of Culture, also head of the staff of Orchestral Direction at the Superior Institute of Art (ISA).

Education
He enrolled at the school of music “Liubomir Pipkov”, Sofia to study flute. After graduating from the music school he started music lessons in Paris, France, with the famous flutist Aurèle Nicolet.
In 1989 was admitted in the National Music Academy “Prof. Pancho Vladigerov”, Sofia. The same period was invited by Prof. Severino Gazzelloni to proceed his music education at the most prestigious music academy in the world – Accademia Nazionale di Santa Cecilia, free of charge and at the same time as a scholarship student at Arts Academy, Rome. A year and a half lived in "Boris Hristov" Foundation in Rome.

During his time as a student at Santa Cecilia, Kristian Koev studied with Dante Milozi – The First Flute in the Rome Radio Orchestra. His ambition was so strong that instead of seven he graduated the Music Academy in four years.

Awards
 First Prize: The National Contest for young instrumentalists “Targovishte”-Bulgaria
 First Prize: The National Contest “Provadia”-Bulgaria
 First Prize and the title Laureate: The International Contest “Spring in Prague”, Italy
 First Prize: Contest of the Rich People for young talents, Milan, Italy
 Honorary Diploma from the Music Forum Tempora Festival
 Honorary Diploma from the Festival Internacional Cervantino
 Honorary Diploma from the Festival Delle Tre Ciminiere
 Honorary Diploma from The Sanremo Music Festival (Festival della canzone italiana)
 Honorary Diploma from the Festival Sofia Music Meeting Italy – Bulgaria – South Korea

The Golden Flute

His Flute was made of real gold – there are just a few such, they are usually made of silver. The unique instrument was made of 14-carat gold, especially for him, in the Japanese factory Miyazawa Flutes. The instrument is golden literally and figuratively. It has become a constant companion to the musician and often completes his name on the posters. "The Golden Flute" name Kristiyan Koev inherited from his teacher, the Italian soloist, Prof. Severino Gazzelloni.

Career
The experts rank Kristiyan Koev among the six best classic flutists in the world.
At the age of 35, Koev has more than 960 concerts performed in the world theaters. He has played with conductors such as Leonard – one of the highest paid conductors in the world, Zubin Meta – the conductor of the three great tenors, Enrique Bátiz Campbell – of the Mexican Philharmonic orchestra, Nanut – of the Taranto Philharmonic orchestra (Italy), Francesco La Vecchia- of the Roman philharmonic orchestra, Patrick Galua – the greatest flutist in the world, Dante Milozzi – the first flute of the Roman radio, Jesus Medina-one of Mexico’s outstanding conductors and music director of The UANL Symphony Orchestra in Monterrey, Mexico, Maestro Eduardo Alvarez – founder of the Music School of the Americana University of Acapulco and Music Director of the Symphony Orchestra of the Autonomous University of the State of Hidalgo, Mexico.
As a soloist Maestro Kristian Koev is an honoured guest of world-famous symphonic orchestras:
“Santa Cecilia”, “Regionale Lazio”, “La internazionale” (Rome), “San Remo”, “Аutonoma Siciliana”(Palermo), “Delle Ciminiere" (Catania), “Como”, ”Soceta de i concerti”(Milano), “Solisti Veneti" (Venecia), "Metropolitan", "Caschais", "Opera"(Lisabon), "Recionale" (Porto), "Statale”(Madeira), The Bellas Artes Chamber Orchestra of Mexico city , Palacio de Bellas Artes, and many others.

Kristiyan Koev is the only musician who performed Flute solo concert in honor of Charles, Prince of Wales during his diplomatic visit in Italy and the only musician who performed solo concert at the birthday celebration of Pope John Paul II. The concert was held at Santa Maria Degli Angelli temple in Rome.

Music Albums
'2007 – Vivaldi: Quattro concerti''• Tempesta di Mare• Il Cardellino
• Concerto in Do Minor• La Notte2007 – Solisti di Napoli classical soundtracks• Conductor Maestra Susana Peshetti
• Kristian Koev, Flute

Performance in foreign productions
• Live Concert for Flute by Raynike in Ancara Music Hall, Turkey; Emil Tabakov, conductor; Kristian Koev, flute
• Interpretando Rodrigo; Music by Joaquin Rodrigo with Orchestra Nazionale di Radio Sofia, Stefano Trasimeni, conductor, Kristian Koev, flute, Alessandro De Pau, guitar
• Gianni Possio Orchestral Works – concert for clavicembalo and harp – Second concert for flute and orchestra; The Bulgarian Radio Symphony Orchestra; Aldo Tarchetti; Kristian Koev (flauto); Todor Petrov (clavicembalo)

References

"1 000 причини да се гордеем, че сме българи" – Book "1000 reasons to be proud to be Bulgarian", Publisher: "Bulgarian Pride" Foundation, 2008, pages: 328, Language: ; ; Cover

External links
 Official Facebook Page 
 KRISTIAN KOEV “ IL FLAUTO D’ ORO “, Di CANTIERE PERMANENTE 
 *Pignataro* – Concerto di Kristian Koev, il “Ragazzo dal Flauto d’Oro” Article 
 Comunicangolo: Kristian Koev & Embrace life @ Alchimia, Milano Article 
 Eva Magazine Article 
 Gianni Possio Official Website\discografia 
 неНосталгично, БНТ-documentary movie 
 http://fad.uncuyo.edu.ar/ 
 Sofia Oggi – Il primo quotidiano in italiano http://www.sofiaoggi.com/Bulgaria/Archive/kristian-koev-la-musica-puo-essere-un-ponte-di-unione-fra-litalia-e-la-bulgaria-anche-al-livello-economico.html]
Enrique Bátiz Campbell – Mexican conductor of Orquesta Sinfónica del Estado de México 
 Maestro Eduardo Alvarez 
24 часа: 
Standartnews: 
Aurèle Nicolet (Flute)

Audio
 Kristian Koev's YouTube Channel 

1970 births
Living people
Musicians from Sofia
Bulgarian classical musicians
Bulgarian flautists
Bulgarian emigrants to Italy